The Xi'an–Ankang railway or Xikang railway, is a single-track, electrified railway line in Shaanxi Province of China, between Xi'an, the provincial capital, and Ankang. As of June 2009, a second track is being planned for the line. Major cities and counties along route include Xi'an, Zhashui County, Zhen'an County, Xunyang County and Ankang.

History
Construction on the line began on 18 December 1996. The railway opened on 8 January 2001. The second track was completed and put into operation on 31 October 2013.

In December 2020, new direct services were introduced between Xunyang railway station and Xi'an railway station. Previously this journey required a change at Xunyang North. These services are operated by China Railway CR200J units.

Line description

The Xikang railway traverses the Qin Mountains, one of the geographic barriers that separate North and South China. Xi'an, the provincial capital is located in the Wei River Valley and Ankang in southern Shaanxi is located in the Han River (Yangtze River tributary) Valley. The line was funded by low-interest development assistance loans from Japan.

Rail connections
Xi'an: Longhai railway, Xi'an–Yan'an railway, Houma–Xi'an railway, Nanjing–Xi'an railway
 Ankang: Xiangyang–Chongqing railway, Yangpingguan–Ankang railway

See also

 List of railways in China

References

Railway lines in China
Rail transport in Shaanxi
Railway lines opened in 2001